The Coat of Arms of the British Indian Ocean Territory was granted in 1990 on the 25th anniversary of the territory's establishment.

The centrepiece of the arms, the shield, bears a palm tree and St. Edward's Crown on a base of three white wavy lines representing the ocean, a sun in splendour in the upper-left corner, and the Union Flag in a chief at the top. Two sea turtles are used as supporters (a hawksbill turtle and a green turtle), representing the local native wildlife. The crest comprises a naval crown through which rises a red tower bearing the territory's flag; there is no helm or mantling.

The motto is In tutela nostra Limuria, Latin for “Limuria is in our charge/trust”. This latinised name  refers to the non-existent continent of Lemuria, once thought to occupy the Indian Ocean.

The palm tree and royal crown also feature in the flag of the British Indian Ocean Territory.

See also
 Gallery of coats of arms of the United Kingdom and dependencies

References

British Indian Ocean Territory
British Indian Ocean Territory
British Indian Ocean Territory culture
British Indian Ocean Territory
British Indian Ocean Territory
British Indian Ocean Territory
British Indian Ocean Territory
British Indian Ocean Territory
British Indian Ocean Territory
British Indian Ocean Territory
British Indian Ocean Territory